The Greatest @Home Videos (formerly The Greatest #AtHome Videos) is an American video clip television series for CBS. Executive produced and hosted by Cedric the Entertainer, the series was produced to fill in primetime broadcast hours due to production shutdowns during the COVID-19 pandemic.

The series initially premiered on CBS as a one-off special The Greatest #StayAtHome Videos on May 15, 2020. On July 2, 2020, the series received a back order of four episodes bringing the first half's total episode count up to five.

On August 26, 2020, CBS announced that the second half of season one would premiere on September 25, 2020, as replacement programming for Fall 2020.

On June 14, 2021, the series was renewed for a second season, which premiered on August 20, 2021.

Format
People who were bored used apps such as TikTok to create videos which CBS said "reflect the creativity, humor and humanity that have emerged from our shared experiences over the past few months." Videos from various sources such as YouTube were put together in one place. Some videos are funny, some touching, and some inspiring. For each video shown, those who made it get to select a charity for CBS to donate to.

Episodes

Series overview

Special (2020)

Season 1 (2020)

Season 2 (2021)

Specials (2022–23)

Development
In an interview, Cedric the Entertainer explained that making these videos helped people stay connected and feel that life was something close to normal. One episode features a group of children giving Tony Hawk a skateboard as a gift with the help of their area's FedEx driver. An example of the creativity in the original special includes a man looking out an airplane window drinking wine, which in fact is taking place in a laundry room with the glass in the washing machine. Each episode was filmed with as few people as possible, using social distancing and taking precautions with people entering Cedric's house.

References

External links 
 Official site
 

2020 American television series debuts
2020s American comedy television series
2020s American video clip television series
English-language television shows
CBS original programming
Television series impacted by the COVID-19 pandemic
Split television seasons